The Mating Mind: How Sexual Choice Shaped the Evolution of Human Nature is a 2003 book by Geoffrey Miller.

Miller argues that the vast majority of human characteristics are fitness indicators or the result of mate choice. Miller argues that even artistic or moral excellence are fitness indicators.

References

2003 non-fiction books
Psychology books